The Ministry of National Defense is a government ministry office of the Republic of Turkey, responsible for coordinating and supervising all agencies and functions of the government concerned directly with national security and the Turkish Armed Forces. It is headquartered at the Bakanlıklar in Ankara.

Ministry of National Defense is responsible for recruitment, procurement, production, logistics, medical care and other tasks to prepare the Armed Forces and its personnel for military operations.

The Ministry of National Defense is headed by the Minister of National Defense, a cabinet-level head who reports directly to the President of Turkey and also a member of the National Security Council.

Organization
Minister of National Defense
 Office of the Private Secretary
 Press and Public Relations Consultancy
 Deputy Ministers
 Inspection Board
 General Directorate of Staff
 General Directorate of Defense and Security
 General Directorate of Plans, Policy and Agreements
 General Directorate of Management Services
 General Directorate of Legal Services
 General Directorate of Recruitment
 General Directorate of Military Health Services
 General Directorate of Budget and Financial Services
 General Directorate of Mapping
 General Directorate of Military Factories
 General Directorate of Naval Shipyards
 General Directorate of Procurement Services
 Defence Industry Agency
 Department of Technical Services
 Department of Internal Audit
 Department of Fuel Supply and NATO POL Facilities Management
 Department of Communications and Information Systems
 Department of National Mine Activity Center
 Military Factory and Shipyard Management Inc. (ASFAT A.Ş.)
 Mechanical and Chemical Industry Corporation 
 National Defense University
 Turkish Armed Forces
 General Staff of the Turkish Armed Forces
 Turkish Land Forces
 Turkish Naval Forces
 Turkish Air Force

Note: Land, Naval and Air forces reports directly to the Minister of National Defense.

Ministers of National Defense

References

External links 
  
Official website 

 
1920 establishments in the Ottoman Empire
Turkey
Ministries established in 1920
Space program of Turkey
Turkey